West Darfur State ( Wilāyat Ḡarb Dārfūr) is one of the states of Sudan, and one of five comprising the Darfur region. Prior to the creation of two new states in January 2012, it had an area of 79,460 km² and an estimated population of approximately 1,007,000 (2006). It borders North and Central Darfur to the east. The Chadian prefectures of Biltine and Ouaddaï lie to the west, while to the north is the prefecture of Bourkou-Ennedi-Tibesti. Al-Junaynah is the capital of the state.  West Darfur has been the site of much of the ongoing Darfur conflict.

References

External links
State profile

 
States of Sudan
Darfur